Bhanu Prakash Singh was an Indian politician. He was the Governor of Goa. He was elected to the Lok Sabha, the lower house of the Parliament of India  as a member of the Indian National Congress.

References

External links
Official biographical sketch on the Parliament of India website

1929 births
2019 deaths
Indian National Congress politicians
Lok Sabha members from Madhya Pradesh
India MPs 1967–1970
India MPs 1962–1967
Governors of Goa